Eloise at Christmastime is a 2003 American-Canadian made-for-television live-action film based on the 1958 book of the same name written by Kay Thompson and illustrated by Hilary Knight. The film was released on November 22, 2003 and was produced by Handmade Films and DiNovi Pictures for Walt Disney Television with distribution handled by the ABC Television Network. It was released on both VHS and DVD in 2003 by Buena Vista Home Entertainment.  As of 2009, the movie was shown in the 25 Days of Christmas programming block on ABC Family, but it was not part of the block in 2010. In 2011 to 2013, it was aired on the Hallmark Channel as part of their "Countdown to Christmas". In 2016, it was aired on Discovery Family.

The film stars young Sofia Vassilieva as Eloise, a six-year-old girl who lives in the penthouse at the top of the Plaza Hotel in New York City.

This story takes place immediately after the events of Eloise at the Plaza; Eloise receives a package full of spy equipment from her friend Leon, the supporting character in the previous film who did spy work with Eloise.

Plot 

The movie begins with a shot of the Plaza Hotel Lobby, with a large pink gift box leaning on the display table, in the middle of the room. The hotel manager, Mr. Salamone, asks one of the staff to take the box to the package room. Two of the staff take the gift box to the package room, as it is super heavy. When they leave, the box is opened and we see Eloise crawling out, a very enthusiastic six-year old girl who lives in a penthouse at the Plaza. Eloise is on a mission to find any presents in the package room from her mother, who travels all over the world and sends Eloise a Christmas gift from her travels every year. This year it’s coming from Paris.

When Eloise does not find any packages from her mother, she then leaves the room in a large mess. She skips towards the lobby, and pushes into a long line at the check-in desk and interrupts a conversation between Mr. Salamone and two patrons, wishing to upgrade their current hotel suite to a park-side view room. Eloise asks Mr. Salamone if there have been any packages from her mother in Paris, and he replies that there hasn't. He pushes her away, telling Eloise that he is currently very busy. Eloise pushes in the line again, offering Mr. Salamone some unnecessary assistance. Mr. Salamone declines, pushing Eloise away from the hectic line again.

Eloise leaves, but is instantly back in a flash, when she notices a suspicious man waiting in the queue. She thinks that this patron is a spy, but Mr. Salamone declines, and instantly changes the subject so that Eloise can leave the line. He requests Eloise to look out for the hotel's Christmas Tree Delivery, which is due to be at the Plaza any moment. He tells Eloise to inform him when the delivery arrives. Eloise leaves the line, and tells the "spy" that she is keeping her eye on him.

During her morning round, a round Eloise makes every morning where she says hello to everyone important in the hotel, she meets Brooks Oliver III, a very nice man who is planning a party at the Plaza. Much to the dismay of Prunella, the head of special events at the Plaza who is very uptight, she takes him away and starts to tell him about parties at the Plaza. Eloise becomes distracted by the hotel’s Christmas tree and lets Brooks go, who is taken away by Prunella. However, Eloise finds out Brooks is not as nice as he seems, as she sees him berate a hotel concierge for bumping into him in the hallway.

As she returns to her penthouse, she encounters Mrs. Thornton, a mean old lady and her dog, Mona. As Eloise’s turtle, Skipperdy, often gets into trouble with Mona and has recently snapped at her, Mrs. Thornton threatens Eloise that she will have the chef turn Skipperdy into turtle soup if he doesn’t stay away from Mona. In her penthouse, she wakes up Nanny, her very rationally-thought caretaker. She orders room service, which is brought to her by Bill, a room service waiter and her best friend, who she acts out a skit with. After the skit, he asks her if she’ll help him set up for a party later in the hotel terrace room at 4:00, which she accepts. Over breakfast, Eloise tells Nanny that the following day she would like to go Christmas shopping, as she would like to do it today, but she has to go see Mr. Peabody, the owner of the Plaza, about Mrs. Thornton’s threat. Nanny warns her not to, as he dislikes Eloise, but she goes anyway.

After pulling a prank to distract Cornelia, his secretary who also dislikes Eloise, Eloise tells Mr. Peabody about Mrs. Thornton, but he dismisses her concerns, as he says he’s expecting someone any moment and she should be worried about Mrs. Thornton instead, as she won’t be with them much longer. Eloise starts to question him about it, but he declines to answer, saying he’s already said enough. Rachel Peabody than arrives, who is revealed to be his daughter.  Although Mr. Peabody and Rachel are father and daughter, they act like they hardly know each other for some unknown reason. Mr. Peabody asks Rachel when he gets to meet her fiancé; Brooks than appears, revealing he is her fiancé and the party he is planning at the Plaza is his wedding, much to Eloise’s dismay. Eloise and Rachel meet, who immediately like each other, but Eloise becomes suspicious of Brooks.

That afternoon, as Eloise and Bill are setting up for a party in the terrace room, Rachel and Brooks arrive with Prunella arranging the wedding.  After Bill drops a tray in shock of seeing Rachel, it is revealed that Rachel and Bill dated a long time ago.  Bill meets Brooks and is seen to be sad that he is her fiancé. That night, as Eloise chats with the night-maid Lily, she learns that Rachel has been at a university in Europe for the past four years, as when Mr. Peabody found out that she and Bill were romantically interested in each other, he sent her far away, hoping to break the ties with Bill as he wanted something better for her than marrying a waiter. When the two pass by Mrs. Thornton’s room without giving her any nightly services, Eloise asks why and learns that there has been a permanent stop to all services for her, and Eloise concludes that when Mr. Peabody said she wouldn’t be with them much longer, he meant she was going to die. Later that night, as Mr. Peabody and Rachel are catching up, he tells her that sending her away was the hardest thing he ever did, but it was the right thing to do. He also tells her Brooks is a good man and he’s all he ever wanted for her.

The next day, Eloise and Nanny spend the day Christmas shopping, with Eloise buying a total of 159 presents and Nanny buying none. Returning to the hotel, Eloise sees Mrs. Thornton as she is getting onto the elevator and faints. She awakens in her bedroom and informs Nanny that she saw the ghost of Mrs. Thornton, who she believes has come back to haunt her. Nanny tells her that she misunderstood the situation and that Mrs. Thornton isn’t going to die, she’s just being evicted and will be moving out the day after Christmas. Taking pity on her, Eloise goes to her room to give her fresh towels and soap, where she tells her the story of her son Edgar. Edgar moved to Bavaria and married into the royal family; as he was now extremely wealthy, he paid to have her live at the Plaza. However, a year ago, a telegram came informing her that Edgar had died and there was no one left to take care of her, as the Bavarian government stole all his money.

Deciding to take matters into her own hands, Eloise plots to save Mrs. Thornton from eviction. The next day, Eloise confronts Mr. Peabody with the information, but he tells her he already knows about her son and tells her what really happened to him: he squandered most of his fortune and then ran off to live in Bavaria to start a new life. To stop his mother from worrying, he wrote to her and said he had married into royalty and would always support her in high style. He sent her most of his money to cover up his lie, and when he died without a cent to his name, she made up the delusion that the government had taken claim to his fortune, leading Eloise to realize Edgar was never a prince. She then asks Mr. Peabody if he believes in true love, who responds by asking her to expand on the question. She than points at a picture of Rachel smiling very happily, and says some people think a smile like that only comes around when you’re truly in love. Mr. Peabody tells Eloise he thinks it’s a matter of opinion and Eloise agrees, but also points out that Rachel smiles differently now and asks him what he thinks, to which he says nothing.

Bill and Rachel become increasingly distant toward each other, while tensions rise between Eloise and Brooks, as she grows increasingly suspicious of Brooks. Since Bill refuses to talk about he and Rachel’s past, Eloise decides to go and find out why Brooks is seemingly so suspicious. While Brooks is in the dining hall one day at lunch, Eloise spies on him from underneath a desert tray and discovers that Brooks is a criminal, as he has borrowed money from all across the country to make it look like he has his own fortune. As he now owes tons of money he is unable to pay back, he plans to marry into a wealthy family, steal their money, and use it to pay off his debts. Eloise tries to warn Mr. Peabody, but Cornelia refuses to let her see him. Eloise also tries to get Nanny to help her, but Nanny refuses, saying that Eloise’s strong dislike of Brooks probably caused her to misunderstand the situation and makes her pink promise to not say anything to anyone about it ever again.

Eloise decides to meddle in Brooks and Rachel’s relationship by breaking them up and getting Rachel back with Bill. She sends Rachel red roses with a card that says “from your secret admirer,” and then convinces her later at her wedding dress fitting that it was Bill who sent them. She learns from Rachel that she and Bill used to put on little shows at the Plaza before she moved to Europe. Learning that Rachel and Brooks have a meeting with Prunella at 4:00 in the Terrace Room, Eloise tricks Brooks into thinking the meeting has been cancelled and tricks Prunella into thinking the meeting is at 5:00 by covertly switching her planner. She then gets Bill to be in the Terrace Room at 3:45 so he can teach her a new song on the piano and lets Rachel arrive at the meeting at 4:00 as scheduled. When Rachel arrives, Eloise says she has to run and get something and that she should stay and sing with Bill like they used to. Rachel and Bill sing “Wherever we Go, Whatever we Do,” and excitedly dance to it as well. Prunella arrives and stops the two, and says to Bill he should remember his place as a waiter at the Plaza. Rachel defends him on account of how Prunella missed their whole meeting and chastises her for it, as Eloise watches in pleasure.

During her morning round the next morning, Eloise notices Rachel, Brooks, and her father having breakfast in the dining hall and spies on them from behind a newspaper. While Eloise is pretending to read the newspaper, she sees an article that says there is a performance of “Gypsy the Musical” tonight, and gets tickets for Rachel and Bill to go, telling Bill they’re a Christmas gift from her to him. She also follows Brooks to the Barber shop, and tricks him into thinking there’s a Harvard alumni party, which is his supposed former business school. Brooks abruptly ends his shave early, saying he has to go to a business meeting and won’t be back until late tonight and leaves. Eloise unfortunately gets a call from her mother, who was supposed to return on Christmas Eve, who tells her that because of the snowstorm going on in New York, they’re not letting any planes take off to New York. However, Nanny tells her they will celebrate Christmas all over again if she doesn’t return in time. Rachel returns to the hotel happy that night, and later Brooks returns and learns from Mr. Salamone that Eloise was lying about the Harvard alumni party.

As the next day is Christmas Eve, Rachel and Brooks wedding day has arrived. After Eloise delivers her Christmas presents to everyone (including Cornelia), she goes to talk to an angry Prunella to take false pity on her, but inadvertently causes Prunella to figure out her plan. Eloise runs to Bill, as she plans to convince him to admit his love for Rachel and have her call off the wedding. Unfortunately, he has already left on vacation to Vermont. Eloise than runs to Rachel’s room, hoping to convince her to stop the wedding as her last hope. While banging on the door for Rachel to open up, Eloise yells that Rachel can’t marry Brooks because there are things about him that she doesn’t know.  But it is Brooks who answers the door, much to Eloise’s horror.  He then asks her what sort of things and says they should “take a little walk” together.

Brooks kidnaps Eloise and locks her in the Plaza’s basement closet to stop her from interfering with the wedding, but he will let her out once they’re legally married and she can do nothing to prevent the wedding. Rachel begins to get cold feet about the wedding, but stays silent about it. Using spy kit equipment from a Christmas present she secretly opened early, Eloise uses the walkie-talkie to reach Nanny. Nanny frees Eloise and they both run to try to stop the wedding. They are unable to make it to the wedding in time, and are forced to climb through the ceiling and watch through a peak hole. Just as it is about to become official, Rachel finally reveals she can’t marry Brooks and stops the wedding. Brooks asks why, and suddenly Bill runs in the door, saddened by the fact that Rachel and Brooks have seemingly already been married. However, Rachel reveals that she is in love with Bill and runs to him. The two kiss, causing Nanny and Eloise to happily giggle, but they are forced to retreat after they are seen by Prunella.

That night, Eloise and Nanny celebrate Christmas Eve with a feast and lots of holiday fudge. Mr. Peabody calls Eloise and tells her he has something to discuss with her. In the lobby, he confronts Eloise about the events of the wedding, having been tipped off by Prunella, to which Eloise admits she is responsible. Mrs. Thornton is offered a permanent stay at the Plaza Hotel after getting enough money from an anonymous source to take care of her for the rest of her life. Mr. Peabody thanks Eloise, which causes Prunella to scold Mr. Peabody for letting a “demonic child” determine who’s fit to marry Rachel. As she scolds Mr. Peabody for not sticking to Brooks, Brooks appears in handcuffs and is being carried away by an FBI agent. Brooks Oliver III was a pseudonym he used to evade the law; his real name is Jimmy Stutts and he’s wanted in three states for forgery, fraud, and extortion.  The whole lobby sings “Hark! The Herald Angels Sing” and to top it off, Eloise’s mother returns home and the two rejoice.

Cast

See also
 List of Christmas films

References

External links
 
 Official Eloise Website
 
 Eloise at Christmastime at UltimateDisney.com

2003 films
2003 television films
Eloise (books)
American children's comedy films
American Christmas films
English-language Canadian films
Canadian children's comedy films
Canadian Christmas films
Christmas television films
Disney direct-to-video films
Films based on children's books
Films set in the 1950s
Films set in hotels
Television sequel films
Films directed by Kevin Lima
Self-reflexive films
Films scored by Bruce Broughton
2000s Christmas films
2000s English-language films
2000s American films
2000s Canadian films